Wooden Bones is the third and final studio album by Canadian rock band Pilot Speed. The song "Light You Up" was featured in a promotional trailer prior to each film at the 2009 Toronto Film Festival.

Track listing

References

2009 albums
Pilot Speed albums
MapleMusic Recordings albums